The Bangladesh National Film Award for Best Story is one of the most prestigious film awards given in Bangladesh. Since 1977, awards have been given in the category of best story.

List of winners

See also
 Bangladesh National Film Award for Best Film

References

Bangladeshi film awards
Awards established in 1977